Grade 22 (also referred to as BPS-Apex) is the highest attainable rank for a Civil Servant in Pakistan. Grade 22 is equal to a 4-star rank of the Pakistan Armed Forces. With over five hundred thousand civil servants and bureaucrats in Pakistan, only a few dozen officers serve in BPS-22 grade at a given time. Hence, not even 2% of the country's civil servants and/or bureaucrats make it to the highest rank. Officers serving in BPS-22 grade are largely considered to be the most influential individuals in the country. 

Each officer who reaches Grade-22 has, on average, a civil service career spanning over 30 years to 32 years. Elevation to Grade-22 is decided by the High Powered Selection Board (HPSB), which is chaired by the Prime Minister of Pakistan. Other ex-officio members of the Board, who advise the PM on promotions, are the Establishment Secretary of Pakistan, the Cabinet Secretary of Pakistan and the Principal Secretary to the Prime Minister of Pakistan.

The following key positions in the country are occupied by Grade-22 Officials:
Secretary to the Government of Pakistan
Special Secretary to the Government of Pakistan
Chief Secretary to a Provincial Government
Director General/ Chairman of a large state-owned corporation or agency such as the Federal Board of Revenue, Federal Investigation Agency, Intelligence Bureau,Pakistan Post,  etc.
Inspector General of Police

Prominent Grade 22 officers (serving and retired)
Roedad Khan
Usman Ali Isani
Shehzad Arbab
Nasir Mahmood Khosa
Tariq Bajwa
Rizwan Ahmed
Babar Yaqoob Fateh Muhammad
Maroof Afzal
Azam Suleman Khan
Shoaib Mir Memon
Mir Ahmed Bakhsh Lehri
Sardar Ahmad Nawaz Sukhera
Muhammad Sualeh Ahmad Faruqi
Sajjad Saleem Hotiana
Raja Muhammad Abbas
Arshad Sami Khan
Allah Bakhsh Malik
Kamran Rasool
Jawad Rafique Malik
Syed Abu Ahmad Akif
Sikandar Sultan Raja
Tasneem Noorani
Shahjehan Syed Karim
Iqbal Hussain Durrani
Hussain Asghar
Allah Dino Khawaja
Fawad Hasan Fawad
Kamran Lashari
Qudrat Ullah Shahab
Mumtaz Ali Shah
Ghulam Ishaq Khan
Jalil Abbas Jilani
Rabiya Javeri Agha
Syed Hassan Raza
Aftab Ghulam Nabi Kazi
Sohail Mahmood
Abdul Basit (diplomat)
Riaz Mohammad Khan
Javid Husain
Inam-ul-Haq (diplomat)
Shamshad Ahmad
Riaz Khokhar
Masood Khan
Najmuddin Shaikh
Tanvir Ahmad Khan
Humayun Khan (diplomat)
Niaz Naik
Abdul Sattar (diplomat)
Agha Shahi
Jalaludin Abdur Rahim
Nasir Durrani
Nargis Sethi
Tehmina Janjua
Fazal-ur-Rehman
Salman Bashir
Khalid Javed - Postal Group

References

 Government of Pakistan